South Scarle is a village and civil parish in the Newark and Sherwood district of Nottinghamshire, England. It has a community centre, a post office and a church.

References

Villages in Nottinghamshire
Civil parishes in Nottinghamshire
Newark and Sherwood